Equestria is the fictional setting of the fourth and fifth generations of the My Little Pony toy line and media franchise, including the animated television series My Little Pony: Friendship Is Magic and My Little Pony: Pony Life. Created by Lauren Faust, the setting incorporates many elements of fantasy, including inspirations from European and Greek mythology.

Equestria serves as the backdrop for the adventures of Twilight Sparkle, the main character of Friendship is Magic, and her friends, collectively referred to as the Mane Six. Equestria is shown to be located on a terrestrial planet, similar to Earth. Equestria hosts many intelligent and sapient creatures; the majority being ponies. Equestria's foundation is described as the result of the cooperation of unicorns, pegasi, and earth ponies. 

The "Bit" is the national currency of Equestria and its territories. The official language of Equestria is called "Ponish". Throughout the series, Equestria is ruled by princesses.

Although shown to be generally peaceful, Equestria engages in wars with various magical and supernatural threats over the course of the series.

Development

Two years were spent on creating the foundation of the series. Pennsylvania Dutch design, steampunk fantasy art, European fairy tales, and Bavarian folk art served as influences for the original pony world. In some cases, Hasbro requested that the show include certain settings but allowed Faust and her team to create its visual style which Hasbro would then base a toyset on; an example is the Ponyville schoolhouse.

History

The history of Equestria, as depicted in My Little Pony: Friendship is Magic, began at the end of the "Age of Eternal Winter". Before founding Equestria, the three major pony types—Earth Ponies, Unicorns, and Pegasi—were separate tribes. This period is described as a chaotic time, when the horse-like windigos brought freezing temperatures and eternal darkness to the world, and other monsters terrorized the populace. The three tribes separately emigrated to the continent of Equus, where they began feuding with each other, which fueled the strength of the windigos. Eventually the tribes set aside their squabbles to unify as the nation of Equestria and defeat the windigos. The foundation of Equestria is celebrated during the annual Hearth's Warming Day festival—which is depicted as being similar to the Christmas or Yule celebrations.

Equestria initially struggled with the task of ensuring that the sun and moon set at the proper times, which drained the powers of Equestria's most powerful sorcerers. The birth of future princesses Celestia and Luna, alicorn sisters who could raise and lower the celestial bodies at will, ushered in an era of prosperity. The sisters were crowned as the rulers of Equestria, and were trained in the use of their powers by the legendary wizard Star Swirl the Bearded.

Under Princess Celestia and Luna, Equestria was able to focus greater magic and resources on its development, despite the emergence of threats like the evil Lord Tirek, Discord, and wars between ponies and the Changeling Hive. Under the princesses, Equestria was transformed from a feudal kingdom into a superpower with an advanced economy. Six legendary ponies wielded the Elements of Harmony to defend Equestria from these threats, and planted the Tree of Harmony so other generations would be able to do the same. The status quo remained unchanged until the corruption of Princess Luna, who transformed into Nightmare Moon with the intent of plunging Equestria into eternal night. This culminated in the one thousand-year exile of Nightmare Moon, who later returned as Princess Luna. 

In Equestria's early history, the northern Crystal Empire was ruled by Princes Amore. Later the tyrannical King Sombra took over the kingdom, and enslaved the Crystal Ponies. After Sombra was defeated by Celestia and Luna with the magical Crystal Heart, he cursed the Crystal Empire to disappear, which it did for one thousand years. The Crystal Empire later reappeared, and was ruled by Princess Cadence and her husband Shining Armor.

By the end of Friendship is Magic, rule of Equestria passed down to Princess Twilight Sparkle. The reign of Twilight Sparkle brought about increases of peace, prosperity, hope and love, as Princess Twilight continued her scientific research and made her diplomatic mission to spread the friendship to every creature in need. Throughout Equestria's history, it remains distant but mostly friendly relations with the other nations like the Zebras and Yaks.

The period after the return of Princess Luna through the ascendancy of Twilight Sparkle is the era most detailed by the main comics, television series, and video games. It is therefore fully canonical, according to the show writers.

Alternate continuity timelines
Time magic is featured in the franchise on several occasions. In the series, time magic was discovered and/or invented by Starswirl, which allowed him to manipulate time and remain ageless. Celestia later outlawed time magic due to the risks of irresponsible time travel, and all knowledge pertaining to it was stored within Starswirl the Bearded Wing of the Canterlot Archives.

In "The Cutie Re-Mark", several alternate versions of Equestria are depicted as a result of Starlight Glimmer changing history. In the first alternate timeline shown, King Sombra expands the Crystal Empire's borders to cover half of Equestria and the Griffon Kingdom. In the second, Queen Chrysalis and the Changelings have conquered Canterlot and forced many ponies into hiding. In the third, Nightmare Moon rules Equestria in eternal night after banishing Celestia to the moon. Further alternate realities include one ruled by Discord, one in which Tirek ravages the land, one in which Flim and Flam bulldoze the Everfree Forest for development, and one in which Equestria is reduced to a barren wasteland. These alternate realities are later undone by Twilight Sparkle.

Inhabitants

Ponies

Development and design
Faust imagined the three different ponies—unicorns, pegasi, and earth ponies—having different cultures and living in various places. She pictured the unicorns in the mountains, pegasi in the clouds, and earth ponies, similar to real horses, on the ground. According to Faust, the entirety of Friendship Is Magic is influenced by the fantasy genre. The team borrowed from mythology; the unicorns are part of European mythology and the pegasi are part of Greek mythology.

In addition, Faust envisioned the ponies as realistic horses who ate hay, lived in barns, pulled carts, wore saddles, and used their mouths to pick up things—qualities which were formerly avoided. After an idea from fellow animator Paul Rudish, many ideas of how the ponies' world was special came to Faust; she imagined the ponies as the stewards of their world who made their weather happen, flowers grow, and animals thrive.

Initially, Faust's designs were similar to the original ponies'. However, they "just didn't feel right" with upturned noses, straight faces, large heads and small bodies. After drawing a doodle of a random pony, Faust decided to use that design. When creating ponies, the artists needed to be attentive to shape and proportion. Their bodies were similar to the shape of beans, head to a ball, and legs to curved triangles. Often, the ponies were the height of three heads, divided into three parts: the head, the largest and longest; the body, which is approximately half the head's height but the same width; and the legs, which are slightly shorter than the head. Other prominent body parts include the neck, which is half the head's width, and the eye, a central element to the ponies' design in placement, size, and shape. While many eyes differ in details, the placement and shape are normally unvarying. Throughout the later seasons of Friendship Is Magic, body types have varied, being designed to embody diverse characteristics, including age and personality.

Earth Ponies
Earth ponies possess an underlying connection to the earth, nature, and the environment that encourages the growth of plant life and a connection with wild animals. Earth pony based technology is purely mechanical and often is intended to replicate things they cannot do themselves. Earth ponies form the backbone of Equestria's economy, operating within most industries sectors involving natural resources, construction or extraction. Their natural talents in agriculture, forestry, and mining extends from plants to rock farms. Compared to pegasi and unicorns, earth ponies exhibit supernatural strength, endurance, stamina, fortitude, and durability.

Pegasi

Pegasi have the unique ability to fly and magically control the weather. This ability is powered by a pair of feathered wings, which is the distinguishing anatomical feature of pegasi compared to other pony races. Pegasi make up the majority of ponies responsible for the postal service, patrolling Equestria's airspace, and controlling Equestria's weather. Pegasi are the only pony able to naturally interact with clouds as if they were tangible; this allows them to walk on and move clouds and, by extension, control the weather (although other pony types are able to due this through artificial means using magic). In the episode "Hurricane Fluttershy", a coordinated team of one hundred pegasi demonstrate their ability to generate hurricane-force winds to funnel water from a lake.

A quality Faust borrowed from her childhood with the pegasi was a cold shower fountain that made her believe pegasi live in the clouds. She credited Paul Rudish for the inspiration of the pegasus ponies controlling the weather when he was drawing a pegasus pony running across clouds and creating rain.

Unicorn Ponies
Unicorns can directly absorb, wield, channel, create and manipulate magic; this ability is powered by a horn of variable length, texture, and color on their forehead. However, a unicorn's horn can be destroyed, taking away most of their magical capabilities. Unicorns are amongst the most educated and scholarly of Equestria's citizens. While other ponies' innate magical talents are "intuitive or instinctive", unicorns require decades of higher education to master any spell beyond the most basic fundamentals. Many spells and abilities are open to all unicorns, but many unicorns specialize in areas like teleportation, transfiguration, or medicine. Generally, unicorns have a collection of various spells relating to their specialty, one being vastly more effective than the rest.

As Hasbro created a castle that Faust put up on her dresser, she believed unicorns would live in the mountains.

Other ponies
Other types of ponies include Crystal ponies, who have a connection with crystals; Thestral ponies have bat-like wings, and slit-pupil eyes as well as abilities of pegasus ponies, night vision, and echolocation; and alicorns, who have the distinguishing features of the other pony races: the horn of a unicorn, the wings of a pegasus, and the fortitude of an earth pony and are rulers of Equestria.

Other inhabitants

The world of Equestria is shown to be inhabited by various magical creatures besides ponies. Faust considered the previous My Little Pony series to be "more focussed on cupcakes and tea parties and it was getting disconnected from its fantasy roots". As a result of this and the fact ponies were based on mythology, she based many of the creatures and villains on mythology. These were modified and redesigned to fit Friendship Is Magic world and demographic.

Zebras
Zebras, such as Zecora, are distinguishable by their body patterns, thinner legs, and thicker stripes though they have similar shapes. Since real-life zebras are native to Africa, the tribal culture of the aforementioned continent serves as an influence to patterns, masks, colours, and homes.

Deer
Deer are depicted as mysterious residents of the Everfree Forest who share a connection to the forestry and surrounding wilderness.

Dragons
Dragons inhabit the aptly named Dragonlands. In the My Little Pony series, typical dragons breathe fire, eat gemstones, and are shown to be aggressive. Though the dragons are based upon traditional designs, they have exaggerated noses and large heads with thin necks to invoke humour. The initial dragon design was more elegant and had resemblance to the ponies.

Changelings
Changelings are insection equine creatures, similar to ponies. They are the children of the hive mother Queen Chrysalis, and are capable of shapeshifting through dark magic. They are shown to feed off of powerful emotions.

Draconequui

Draconequus are beings of immense power, powerful enough to alter reality at a whim. Discord is the only example of a Draconequus portrayed in the main television series; however, he and others reference Draconequui as being a species, implying that there are more than one. The species is a dragon-like chimera made from the body parts of different animals.

Geography

Equestria is the largest equine nation, stretching across a peninsula-continent that touches both the northern arctic and subarctic poles; located on an Earth-like planet which, within the Friendship is Magic television series, has not been specifically named. Equestria reaches from the western Luna Ocean to the eastern Celestia Sea, bordering the northern Crystal Empire and the southern Queendom of Changlings.

The Equestrian continent's diverse geography ranges, biomes, provinces and settlements are modeled after or based on North American cities and the nearctic realm. The full geography of the Equestria is currently unexplored and evolving to fit the needs of the show writers, and is currently limited to a part of the continent of Equus (the Equestrian continent), which is controlled mostly by the Equestrian nation. The Equestrian-explored portion of the continent is flanked by two vast oceans, bounded to the north by the mountainous Frozen North region and extends across the northern and southern hemispheres, ending with the Bone Dry Desert that borders the Mysterious South region. However, a map included in the Friendship Is Magic film indicates vast areas beyond these regions.

Like Earth, Equestria's world has one moon, and is depicted as being part of a solar system. Questions regarding heliocentrism or geocentrism are complicated by the fact that Celestia and Luna can move the Sun and Moon, respectively, at a mere whim. Similar constellations exist; with the caveat that most of them are also dangerous monsters, such as Canis Major and Ursa Minor. In relation to the "Human World" its not clear if Equestria is located in a parallel universe, or somewhere in the same universe as Earth.

Notable settlements, territories, dependencies and major population centers in Equestria are identified throughout the series and used as the setting for one or more episodes. Most minor locations, or vaguely referenced areas outside Equestria, both in the television series and associated media aren't specified whether these locations are part of Equestria or not. The films, television series, and other franchise media take place in many locations and their exact affiliation with Equestria is not explored.

As the creator of the show wrote, Lauren Faust explained on various social media pages, that the Everfree Forest is west of Ponyville, Sweet Apple Acres is southwest, and both Fluttershy's cottage and meadow are located north of the farm. Canterlot is northeast of Ponyville. However, in subsequent interviews, both Faust and Jayson Thiessen mentioned that the geography and continuity of the show are fluidly defined and are subject to change as necessary,

Capital Region
The Capital Region is Equestria's foundation and "ancestral lands", where the united cooperation between the unicorns, pegasi, and earth ponies brought an end to Eternal Winter. The Capital Region represents Equestria's original sovereign borders before the dynastic reign of Princess Celestia; all outlying territories represent subsequent thousand year expansion of the nation's imperialist interests. Much of the Capital Regions are "crown lands"; i.e. they are legally considered public land and is apart from the monarch's private estate.

Ponyville
Ponyville is the home of the series' main characters—Twilight Sparkle, Rainbow Dash, Applejack, Pinkie Pie, Fluttershy, Rarity, and Spike. Faust aimed for a "fairy-tale kind of feel" with Ponyville. Her photo references to Dave Dunnet were German cottages. His design incorporated elements which were part of real horses such as horseshoe-shaped archways, hay bales, and troughs.

Ponyville is known for its agricultural produce—apples, pears, carrots, etc.—and is home of "Sweet Apple Acres", Equestria's only source of domesticated zap apple jam. Ponyville has a school district, a diplomatic mission, a tourist destination and a rail center—being the first/last connecting stop between Canterlot and other principalities. Ponyville incorporates minor influences from traditional Americana.

The town has a host of eccentric characters, and is the setting for many episodes of the Friendship is Magic series. Twilight Sparkle's first impression of Ponyville upon first arrival was "Everypony in this town is crazy!"

The season 4 finale, "Twilight's Kingdom", introduces the Castle of Friendship in Ponyville as the residence of Twilight Sparkle, her assistant Spike, and her pupil Starlight Glimmer.

According to the book Art of Equestria, which describes the creation of Friendship is Magic, the creator of the series, Lauren Faust, originally proposed the name Fillydelphia (a pun on the city of Philadelphia) instead of Ponyville. The series later added Fillydelphia as a new, separate city.

Faust wrote in a comment on her DeviantArt page that the Everfree Forest is west of Ponyville, Sweet Apple Acres is southwest, Canterlot is northeast, and Fluttershy's cottage and meadow are located north of the farm. However, in subsequent interviews, both Faust and the supervising director and executive producer of the series, Jayson Thiessen, mentioned that the geography and continuity of the show are loosely defined and may change as necessary, and a layout artist for the series stated on December 10, 2011, that the production team had no official map of Equestria for reference.

Upon the release of Art of Equestria, however, an official map was released. It suggests that the Everfree Forest is to the east of Ponyville, Sweet Apple Acres to the southeast, and Fluttershy's cottage and meadow are located north of the farm.

Canterlot

Canterlot is the capital city of Equestria, built on the side of the Foal Mountains. Canterlot is the setting of the royal court of Princess Celestia and Luna and the residence of Twilight Sparkle before Ponyville. Canterlot Castle is often at the centre of state occasions and royal hospitality.

Faust aimed for a "European feel" with Canterlot. Her photo references to Dunnet were castle and cathedrals. Faust stated she preferred Dunnet's first instinct to his later more "cartoony" drawings of Canterlot; subsequently, he went back to the way he first drew the location. The stained glass windows reflect an awareness of the world. Its spires and turrets are similar to the Arthurian castles of Camelot, its color pallette and mountaintop position represent royalty.

One of Faust's inspirations for Canterlot, with its castle carved into the side of the mountain, was Minas Tirith from The Lord of the Rings. Ted Anderson and Agnes Garbowska's inspiration for ancient Canterlot was ancient Rome.

According to Lauren Faust, Canterlot was originally called "Canterbury", after the historical English city, and the name "Canterlot" was suggested by her husband Craig McCracken.

Cloudsdale
Cloudsdale is the home of the pegasi. It is influenced by classical Greece and Rome; it has pillars and columns, which were choices based on the story. The show also references the Ancient Olympic Games, through Cloudsdale's use of tests of speed and agility. Unlike other cities, Cloudsdale floats on a series of clouds, and is only accessible by winged creatures and creatures that have had a "cloud-walking spell" cast upon them. It is the largest known Pegasi settlement in the realm. Cloudsdale is said to be the original home and birthplace of Rainbow Dash and Fluttershy. 

Cloudsdale is a pun on Clydesdale, a breed of horse; according to Lauren Faust, the name "Cloudsdale" was originally suggested by her husband Craig McCracken. The city is first depicted in "Sonic Rainboom".

Everfree Forest
The Everfree Forest is a large, enchanted forest grove in the boundaries adjacent to the Ponyville township; it is usually referred to simply as "the Forest". The Everfree Forest is home to Zecora and many wild creatures. As it is intended to be wild and untamed, its color palette is the opposite of Ponyville's and also has messier shapes. In its earlier development sketches, the creative team experimented with different palettes.

The forest is considered to be extremely dangerous, and travel through it is prohibited. The forest is considered uninhabitable by all but the native Everfree Deers who inhabit it. It is the location of the Castle of Two Sisters, the Mirror Pool, and other enchanted phenomena. Due to the forest's rich biodiversity of flora and fauna, Zecora frequently travels into the Forest for various reasons; she built her hut within to more easily harvest ingredients for her potions.

Frozen North
The Frozen North is dominated by the Yaket Mountain Range, north of Equestria, and characterized by an alpine climate, subarctic montane ecosystems, and polar climate. It is a setting in the IDW comic My Little Pony: Friends Forever issue 36. It has short cool summers and long cold winters, and biomes consisting of taiga, treeless tundra, glaciers, exotic medicinal plants, and permanent ice sheets.

Crystal Empire
The Crystal Empire is introduced in season three's premiere episode. It was founded by Princess Amore, a female unicorn who appears in the IDW comics' "My Little Pony: FIENDship is Magic Issue #1" and whose name appears in Little, Brown and Company's "The Journal of the Two Sisters". Celestia addresses the Crystal Empire as a sister nation that is part of Equestria, and the crystal ponies refer to themselves as Equestrian. In "The Ballad of the Crystal Empire", Twilight Sparkle mentions the Crystal Kingdom as part of the Crystal Ponies' history. It is also home to the Crystal Ponies. The book "Twilight Sparkle and the Crystal Heart Spell" names the Crystal Empire as part of Equestria.

The Crystal Empire is a non-sovereign monarchy and technically the oldest of Equestria's principalities; its existence predates it by centuries. After the conflict instigated by King Sombra, the capital vanished from existence and the empire was annexed by Equestria. The Crystal Heart is the empire's most sacred magical artifact, which possesses the power to absorb, magnify, and deflect emotions. The crystal ponies used it in peacetime to exponentially amplify the power of love and project hope and love across Equestria. In times of conflict, it can be used as a weapon to demoralise the armies of would be aggressors.

Celestial Coast
The Celestia Sea is located east of Equestria, and is analogous to the Atlantic Ocean. The region's biomes, climate, and geographic terrain are equally analogous to Eastern Canada and the Eastern United States. The coastline is shown to be heavily urbanized. Across the sea, to the far east lies the Griffon Continent; notable nations include Griffonstone, the Griffish Isles, Bug Bear Territory, the Lands of the Hippogriffs, and the Lands of the Dragon.

Manehattan

Manehattan is based on the archipelago of Manhattan and Long Island, portrayed as a large port metropolis, with many landmarks resembling those from New York City. A mirror of the Statue of Liberty, the "Mare Statue," is located on Friendship Island. The design and architecture of Manehattan is based on the 20th century and includes historical references. Phil Caesar of DHX Media stated he tried to avoid the use of modern technology within the city. Manehattan usually had things on top of its buildings.

It is first depicted in "The Cutie Mark Chronicles" and featured prominently in "Rarity Takes Manehattan". The city is characterised by 20th century technologies; including tall buildings and skyscrapers with asphalt streets decorated with electric jumbotrons, neon signs, and lampposts. Ponies' primary form of transportation are pony-drawn taxi carriages and underground metro railway system. Manehattan is the most densely populated and ethnically diverse city in Equestria, hosting all manner of races and species, and is a major commercial, financial and cultural center.

Starlight's Village, also called Our Town, is a community in the Manehattan region and is characterised by a semi-arid climate.

Hollow Shades
Hollow Shades was first mentioned in "Apple Family Reunion". The town first physically appeared in the Map of Equestria, a hand-drawn piece of artwork that lays out the canonical layout of Equestria, located east of Canterlot, tucked underneath a forest canopy, and hidden behind Foal Mountain.

Seaward Shoals
Seaward Shoals is portrayed as a small rocky coastal port town, similar to those of the New England region of the United States. Also called Silver Shoals or Rocky Shoals, the community is the setting of the episode "P.P.O.V. (Pony Point of View)". The former Princesses, Luna and Celestia, retired to this region upon abdicating the throne.

Griffish Isles
Griffish Isles, an Equestrian archipelago commonwealth, located in the Celestia Sea off the north-western coast of continental "Griffon continent", and is analogous to the real world British Isles. On the official map, it is also very close to the Bug Bear Territory. Equestrian settlements include Buckingham, Manechester, and Trottingham (a portmanteau of 'Nottingham', an English city, and 'trot', a jogging speed for horses) the regional capitol city of Griffish Isles. The Griffish Isles is first mentioned in "Stare Master"—where Rarity is making 20 gold-lined gowns for ponies there—and later mentioned in "Luna Eclipsed", "Simple Ways", and "Crusaders of the Lost Mark".Trottingham itself is said to be based on the British city of Birmingham and the ponies that inhabit it wear clothing inspired by British culture and have Cockney accents. Notable residents of Griffish Isles include Pipsqueak before a move, and Sassy Saddles before moving to the Equestrian mainland.

Luna Coast

Las Pegasus
Las Pegasus is depicted as a floating cloud city, like Cloudsdale. Based on the cities of Las Vegas and Paradise, Nevada, Las Pegasus is portrayed as "one big party", with many hotels, resorts, nightlife, amusement parks, restaurants, arcades, and casinos. Las Pegasus was the setting of the episode "Viva Las Pegasus". Las Pegasus actively competes with Applewood and Manehatten for the title of "entertainment capitol of the world".

Mysterious South
This region is known for its arid deserts, temperate prairies and tropical rainforest biomes.

Appleloosa

Appleloosa is the most populous settlement in the region and is first featured in "Over a Barrel". Dodge Junction is based on the cities of the American Wild West, and is portrayed as a bustling township that mainly revolves around a cherry farm run by the earth pony Cherry Jubilee. Similar to Dodge Junction, Appleloosa, a pun of the Appaloosa horse breed, is a setting based on the cities of the American Wild West and mainly revolves around an apple orchard that is home to members of the "Apple Family". Appleloosa is depicted as bordering on the buffalo lands, home of the indigenous buffalo tribes. Appleloosa is also the hometown of Applejack's cousin Braeburn.

The Badlands
The Badlands are in the remote desert backcountry, and are known to be populated by terrifying creatures, such as diamond dogs, giant worms, and rogue dragons.

Somnambula
Somnambula, roughly based on Egypt and North Africa, has an arid, desert climate, excluding a few oases. It is notable as a city that the pony adventurer Daring Do has saved twice. Somnambula, a heroic pegasus who rescued the prince of the Kingdom from a sphinx, is the city's namesake. The city is noted as once being ruled over by pharaohs, and is first mentioned in the episode "Stranger than Fan Fiction", and shown again in the episode "Daring Done?".

Other locations

Hope Hollow
Hope Hollow is a township located in an unspecified region of Equestria. It was primarily lead by the Skies family, who served as the mayors for at least three generations. Petunia Petals runs at least two businesses in the town, and assists the Mayor in fulfilling seven government jobs in total, making her arguably the most important pony in the town.

Mentioned locations
The setting of San Franciscolt is based on the city of San Francisco, and is mentioned in the book Twilight Sparkle and the Crystal Heart Spell.

In episodes throughout the series and in promotional material, other locations are mentioned, but not used as settings. A partial list includes Baltimare, based on the city of Baltimore; Fillydelphia, which is based on the city of Philadelphia and was the original name for Ponyville when the show was in development; and Vanhoover, which is based on Vancouver, Canada and is described as the former home of "Grand Pear", Applejack's grandfather.

Appearances

Fourth generation of My Little Pony franchise 
Equestria first appeared in the fourth incarnation of the My Little Pony toyline and media franchise. It is the setting of the My Little Pony: Friendship Is Magic television series, and its associated media including comics, films, and video games.

Fifth generation of My Little Pony franchise 
Equestria, but years after the Friendship Is Magic stories, is the setting of the computer animated film My Little Pony: A New Generation (2021), which launched the fifth incarnation of the My Little Pony franchise.

Notes

References

Bibliography
 
 

My Little Pony: Friendship Is Magic
Fictional elements introduced in 2010
Fictional countries in other worlds
 Fictional planets
Fictional principalities
Fictional matriarchies
Mythopoeia